The Spooky Bunch (小姐撞到鬼 a.k.a. 撞到正) is a 1980 Hong Kong movie directed by Ann Hui.

The film is about a Cantonese opera troupe arrives on Cheung Chau Island to perform a show under the request by a wealthy man,  Mr Ma who insists that and Ah Chi (Josephine Siao), their second rate supporting actress, takes the leading role in the performance.  Mr Ma also invites his nephew Dick Ma (Kenny Bee) to the island to watch the show.  He hopes by arranging this his nephew will marry Ah Chi so that his family curse being done by Ah Chi's her grandfather placed on this grandfather can be released.

Cast includes
 Kenny Bee - Dick
 Olivia Cheng - (credited as Meng-Har Cheng)
 Cheung Kam 
 Kwan Chung
 Lau Hark-Sun - (credited as Kexuan Liu)
 Tina Lau 
 Josephine Siao - Ah Gee
 Zheng Mengxia - (credited as Mang-ha Cheung)

External links
 
 Review at illuminatedlantern.com
 HK cinemagic entry

1980 films
1980s Cantonese-language films
Films directed by Ann Hui
Hong Kong ghost films
Films about Cantonese opera
1980s Hong Kong films